Against the Tide of Years is the second out of the three alternate history novels of the Nantucket series by S. M. Stirling. The novel was released in the United States, Canada, and the United Kingdom on May 1, 1999.

Plot introduction
In the Island in the Sea of Time, the island of Nantucket in Massachusetts is transported by an unknown phenomenon (called "The Event" in the series) on March 17, 1998 at 9:15 P.M. EST back in time to the Bronze Age circa 1250s BC (corresponding to the late Heroic Age of the Trojan War). Against the Tide of Years is set from 8 to 10 years afterward.

Plot summary
As the series progresses, it becomes clear to Nantucket's government that sitting back and adopting isolationism will only profit those renegades who, under the leadership of ex-Coast Guard lieutenant William Walker, have fled the island to exploit the Bronze Age peoples of Europe and the Middle East. Walker—who is as capable as he is callous—exploits the "magic" of gunpowder, iron-forging, and the spinning jenny to build up an empire of his own, one that threatens to conquer the entire world unless the people of Nantucket build an army, a navy, and a web of foreign alliances to take the fight to Walker.

Against the Tide of Years takes place approximately 10 years after the events of the first book. The leadership of the Republic of Nantucket has invested a great deal of time and effort into building up a substantial military force, both a deep-water navy and a Marine Corps, but the bulk of Nantucket's population are more interested in commerce and exploration than in bringing the renegade Walker to justice. A sneak attack on Nantucket itself by the nation of Tartessos, led by an ally of Walker, unites the factions of the Republic behind an all-out effort to topple Walker's growing empire, centered in Achaea (Greece), in a two-pronged campaign, attacking Tartessos and opening a second front in the Middle East (through an alliance with Babylon, the Hittite Empire and Mitanni).

Closer to home, the Nantucket islanders embark on some North American colonization, particularly in Long Island, anticipating by thousands of years 17th century colonization of the same area.

See also

 The Emberverse series

References

External links
 Sample Chapters
 

1999 American novels
1999 science fiction novels
Canadian alternative history novels
Nantucket series
Novels by S. M. Stirling
Roc Books books